Gareth-Michael Skarka is an e-book author and game designer who founded Adamant Entertainment and has worked primarily on e-published role-playing games.

Career
Gareth-Michael Skarka's cinematic Hong Kong Action Theatre! (1996) was first published by the small-press RPG company Event Horizon Productions. Skarka co-authored the swashbuckling Skull & Bones (2003) campaign background for Green Ronin Publishing's Mythic Vistas series. Based in Lawrence, Kansas, Skarka started his company Adamant Entertainment in 2003, publishing material almost entirely for the electronic market, and with a focus on role-playing games. Skarka later supported Skull & Bones by his own Adamant Entertainment. When regular Cubicle 7 editor Dominic McDowall-Thomas was busy with a consultancy contract, Skarka stepped in to edit Starblazer Adventures (2008).

Adamant Entertainment has designed licensed role-playing downloads for Doctor Who and Star Trek along with original worlds.

Unreleased transmedia game 
In 2011, Skarka ran a Kickstarter campaign which attracted $49,324 in funding for development and publication of his Far West role-playing game, and had regularly posted updates to his Kickstarter after missing deadlines. Far West was intended as a transmedia project including a fiction collection (Tales of the Far West, published in e-book format 30 January 2012) and a role-playing game (Far West Adventure Game, intended for release in December 2011, but still incomplete as of the 10th anniversary of the project’s successful funding). Skarka maintains that he intends to release the product  despite the fact that no progress has been demonstrated for over a decade.

References

External links
 Gareth-Michael Skarka :: Pen & Paper RPG Database archive

Living people
People from Lawrence, Kansas
Role-playing game designers
Year of birth missing (living people)